The 2012 LKL Three-point Shootout was an event part of the LKL All-Star Day that took place in Klaipėda's Švyturys Arena on March 2. The winner of this event was Žygimantas Šeštokas of BC Juventus.

Results 
This contest resembled the NBA Three-point Shootout. Five racks of basketball were set up at five different angles around the basket. Each contestant was given a minute to attempt 25 three-pointers. Each rack contained five basketballs. The first four basketballs in each rack, if made, were worth 1 point, while the last basketball was worth 2 points. The results of this contest are documented below:

References 

Shoot